Hong Kong Academy (HKA) is a non-profit independent international co-educational day school for students ages 3–18 in Hong Kong. The school was founded in 2000 by Teresa Richman and Ben Frankel. The middle school was added in September 2006 and in 2007 the board approved the inclusion of a high school programme that began in 2008/9 academic year. HKA graduated its first IB Diploma cohort in May 2012.

Campus
The campus was located in Wan Chai and Kennedy Town. In August 2013 the school moved to its new permanent site in Sai Kung. The Sai Kung Campus was awarded the Gold BEAM Plus certificate by Hong Kong Green Building Council for its environmentally friendly design.

Curriculum 
Hong Kong Academy is a fully authorised three-programme IB World School, offering the Primary Years Programme (PYP), Middle Years Programme (MYP) and Diploma Programme (DP).

See also
 List of schools in Sai Kung District

References

External links 
 

Schools in Hong Kong
International schools in Hong Kong
International Baccalaureate schools in Hong Kong
Sai Kung Town
Kennedy Town
Association of China and Mongolia International Schools
Educational institutions established in 2000
2000 establishments in Hong Kong